The Secret of the Sahara is an Italian television miniseries directed by Alberto Negrin and broadcast in 1988 in four episodes of approximately 90 minutes each. A version comprising seven approximately 50-minute episodes also exists. Produced by RAI, ZDF, Televisión Española and TF1, a condensed version was later shown in cinemas. It takes its main inspiration from the books of Emilio Salgari with some elements from Pierre Benoit's Atlantida.

Plot
In 1925, an American archaeologist, Desmond Jordan moves to Africa, seeking the "Speaking Mountain". This brings him into the middle of the Sahara desert, where he meets some deserters from the French Foreign Legion. Jordan escapes with Orso (Bear) from a siege by Ryker, a lieutenant of the battalion, and moves towards the mountain.

Ryker and El Hallem, the head of the local tribes, pursue Jordan, who has gone blind while approaching the mountain. The lieutenant gives vent to his violence, murdering some locals and sparing only their queen, Anthea. Later she cures Jordan's blindness and, together with a redeemed El Hallem, helps the archeologist to defeat Ryker.  Eventually, Jordan helps Anthea and Orso discover the secret of the mountain.

Cast
 Michael York – Desmond Jordan
 James Farentino – Caliph of Timbuktu
 Ben Kingsley – Sholomon
 Andie MacDowell – Anthea
 David Soul – Lieutenant Riker
 Miguel Bosé – El Hallem
 Daniel Olbrychski – Hared
 Diego Abatantuono – Orso
 Delia Boccardo – Yasmine
 Ana Obregón – Tamameth
 Radost Bokel – Parizade
 William McNamara – Philip Jordan
  – Kerim
 Mathilda May – Myriam
 Jean-Pierre Cassel – Major De Brosse

Production
The filming was done mainly in Morocco.

The original soundtrack is by Ennio Morricone; the main theme is Saharan Dream performed by Amii Stewart.

See also
 Sahara

Notes

External links
 

1980s Italian television miniseries
Films scored by Ennio Morricone
Films based on works by Emilio Salgari
Films based on Atlantida
Films directed by Alberto Negrin
Television series set in the 1920s
1987 television films
1987 films
Adventure television series
Italian adventure films
Television shows based on works by Emilio Salgari
1980s Italian films